Evimirus pentagonius is a species of mite in the family Eviphididae. It was first described in 1996 by Wolfgang Karg.

References

Mesostigmata
Articles created by Qbugbot
Animals described in 1996
Taxa named by Wolfgang Karg